Slam is the 7th solo album of Joe Lynn Turner released in 2001. In 2006, the album was reissued with a bonus track 'Challenge Them All' which replaced the track 'Cover Up'.

Track listing
"Bloodsucker" (Held/Kajiyama/Turner) - 4:17
"Eye for an Eye" (Held/Kajiyama/Turner) - 5:17
"Deliver Me" (Kajiyama/Turner) - 3:38
"Heart of the Night" (Kajiyama/Turner) - 5:03
"Slam" (Held/Kajiyama/Turner) - 5:22
"Dark Days" (Kajiyama/Turner) - 3:58
"Possession" (Kajiyama/Turner) - 4:50
"Show Yourself" (Kajiyama/Turner) - 4:52
"Cover Up" (Held/Kajiyama/Turner) - 3:40
"Hard Time" (Kajiyama/Turner) - 3:58
"Evil" (Held/Kajiyama/Turner) - 4:26
"Always Tomorrow" (Kajiyama/Turner) - 4:29
"Challenge Them All" *

 *Bonus track on the 2006 reissue. it replaces 'Cover Up'

Personnel
Joe Lynn Turner: Lead vocals
Akira Kajiyama: Guitars
Eric Czar: Bass
Kenny Kramme: Drums
Paul Morris: Keyboards

References

Joe Lynn Turner albums
2001 albums